3.0 is the ninth Spanish album and eleventh studio album by American recording artist Marc Anthony. It was released on July 23, 2013. It is his first original salsa album in over a decade. "Vivir Mi Vida," a Spanish cover of the Khaled song "C'est la vie", was released as the first single on April 15, 2013. "Cambio de Piel", was released as the second single on October 8, 2013. The album was nominated for Album of the Year and won Best Salsa Album at the 2014 Latin Grammy Awards.

Commercial performance 
3.0 debuted at number 5 on the US Billboard 200, selling 47,000 copies in its first week. The album is certified 13x platinum  (Latin) by the RIAA.

Track listing

Charts

Weekly charts

Year-end charts

Sales and certifications

See also
 Lo Nuestro Award for Tropical Album of the Year

References

External links

2013 albums
Marc Anthony albums
Albums produced by Sergio George
Sony Music Latin albums
Latin Grammy Award for Best Salsa Album